Quittengo was a comune (municipality) in the Province of Biella in the Italian region Piedmont, located about  northeast of Turin and about  northwest of Biella.  From 1 January 2016 Quittengo, along with San Paolo Cervo, was absorbed by the neighbouring municipality of Campiglia Cervo.

As an autonomous commune Quittengo bordered the following municipalities: Campiglia Cervo, Mosso, Sagliano Micca, San Paolo Cervo, Veglio.

Twin towns — sister cities
Quittengo is twinned with:

  Castelmagno, Italy, since 1975

References

Former municipalities of the Province of Biella
Frazioni of the Province of Biella
Cities and towns in Piedmont
Campiglia Cervo